Alloway railway station is a closed railway station on the North Coast railway line, Queensland. The name is derived from the Scottish town of Robert Burns fame.

References

Disused railway stations in Queensland
North Coast railway line, Queensland